Games is a 1967 American psychological horror film directed by Curtis Harrington, and starring Simone Signoret, James Caan, and Katharine Ross. Its plot follows two jaded Manhattan socialites who engage in a series of mind games with a German cosmetics agent whom they invite into their home.

Plot
Businessman Paul Montgomery and his heiress wife Jennifer are two wealthy, but blasé, Upper East Side New York socialites with an attitude sometimes accompanying the over-privileged: a propensity to amuse themselves in a bizarre, chic, and upscale fashion. They frequently host parlor tricks and other social games for their peers at their spacious townhouse, occasionally revealing what appears to be a playfully sadistic streak.

Lisa Schindler, an older German woman, arrives at their door one day selling cosmetics. After she nearly faints and falls ill, Jennifer agrees to let her spend the night. The couple take a liking to Lisa, who professes to have psychic abilities, and Jennifer asks her to arrange some "games" for their amusement. Lisa proceeds to set up several situations of simulated domestic discord that the couple can react to, among them being a staged affair between Jennifer and the grocery deliveryman, Norman. Paul is initially enraged upon finding Norman in the couple's bedroom, but is bemused when Lisa appears, revealing it to be a phony setup.

When Norman delivers groceries the next day, Paul witnesses him make a romantic advance toward Jennifer. Paul threatens him with a revolver, and fires the gun at him, but it discharges blanks. Paul and Jennifer begin to laugh, revealing to Norman they are only joking. Paul playfully fires the gun again, but this time it shoots Norman in the head, killing him. In a panic, Paul stores Norman's bloodied corpse in a small elevator in the home, and Jennifer sends Lisa to the drugstore to purchase a salve to divert her.

That night, Jennifer drugs Lisa with a sedative so Paul can decide how to dispose of Norman's body. He ultimately chooses to encase it in plaster, posing it as a new statue among the couple's collection. In the morning, Lisa does a tarot reading for Jennifer, drawing the Death card, which upsets her. Late in the night, Lisa approaches Jennifer, confiding in her that she senses a ghost in the house. In the parlor, Jennifer is horrified to see an apparition of Norman with a bullet through his eye.

Lisa departs in the morning after a confrontation with Paul, and Paul heads to Maine on a business trip, leaving Jennifer alone. While watching television, Jennifer hears noises in the house, and the electricity goes out. In the kitchen, she sees the figure of a man approaching, resembling Norman. She swiftly enters the elevator and ascends upstairs, where she attempts to use the telephone, but finds it disabled. Norman enters the room and approaches Jennifer, his eye bloodied, and she fearfully shoots him several times, killing him. Paul enters the room moments later, and removes a prosthetic piece from Norman's eye. Paul calmly phones the police, reporting that his wife has committed a murder. Jennifer realizes she has been set up by Paul and manipulated into killing someone so he can inherit her fortune; Norman, who agreed to participate, was an unwitting casualty.

After Jennifer's arrest, Paul and Lisa share a celebratory drink as Paul gives her a ten-percent cut of Jennifer's fortune. As they have their drinks, Paul soon begins to feel ill. Realizing Lisa has poisoned his drink, he collapses moments later and dies. Lisa leaves the townhouse with a briefcase full of the money

Cast

Production notes
Director Curtis Harrington wrote the role of Lisa with Marlene Dietrich in mind to play the part. The producers vetoed the idea, however, so Simone Signoret was cast instead. Signoret agreed to take the role after watching Harrington's 1961 film, Night Tide. Caan was cast after his appearances in two Howard Hawks films.

The film was shot on a budget of $1 million. Though set in Manhattan, filming took place at Universal Studios in Los Angeles, California, beginning November 30, 1966.

Release
Games premiered in New York City at the Sutton Theater on September 17, 1967. It subsequently opened at the Plaza Theatre in Los Angeles on January 25, 1968.

Critical reception
In The New York Times, Vincent Canby wrote, "Mr. Harrington's story might have been made to order for a 30-minute Alfred Hitchcock television show. In stretching it out to 98, commercial-free minutes, the director has been forced to pad, but the padding, which includes a strong, enigmatically humorous performance by Simone Signoret, is of top quality." Canby also found James Caan and Katherine Ross, "attractive and believable," and concluded that the film is "a most diverting pastime."

Home media
The film was given a belated VHS release by Gaiam, Inc., in 1995, and Universal Studios Home Video in 2000. It was released on DVD in Spain by Universal Pictures. In 2011, it was released as part of Universal's Vault Series on DVD-R. Scream Factory released the film on Blu-ray for the first time on February 13, 2018.

References

External links
 
 
 
 
 

1967 films
1960s psychological thriller films
American psychological thriller films
Films directed by Curtis Harrington
Films set in New York City
Films shot in Los Angeles
Poisoning in film
1960s English-language films
1960s American films